In mathematics, a minimum bottleneck spanning tree (MBST) in an undirected graph is a spanning tree in which the most expensive edge is as cheap as possible. A bottleneck edge is the highest weighted edge in a spanning tree. A spanning tree is a minimum bottleneck spanning tree if the graph does not contain a spanning tree with a smaller bottleneck edge weight. For a directed graph, a similar problem is known as Minimum Bottleneck Spanning Arborescence (MBSA).

Definitions

Undirected graphs 

In an undirected graph  and a function , let  be the set of all spanning trees Ti. Let B(Ti) be the maximum weight edge for any spanning tree Ti. We define subset of minimum bottleneck spanning trees S′ such that for every  and  we have  for all i and k.

Directed graphs 

Node L is called the root of arborescence. An arborescence is a spanning arborescence if . MBST in this case is a spanning arborescence with the minimum bottleneck edge. An MBST in this case is called a Minimum Bottleneck Spanning Arborescence (MBSA).

Properties 

A  MST (or minimum spanning tree) is necessarily a MBST, but a MBST is not necessarily a MST.

Camerini's algorithm for undirected graphs 
Camerini proposed an algorithm used to obtain a minimum bottleneck spanning tree (MBST) in a given undirected, connected, edge-weighted graph in 1978. It half divides edges into two sets. The weights of edges in one set are no more than that in the other. If a spanning tree exists in subgraph composed solely with edges in smaller edges set, it then computes a MBST in the subgraph, a MBST of the subgraph is exactly a MBST of the original graph. If a spanning tree does not exist, it combines each disconnected component into a new super vertex, then computes a MBST in the graph formed by these super vertices and edges in the larger edges set. A forest in each disconnected component is part of a MBST in original graph. Repeat this process until two (super) vertices are left in the graph and a single edge with smallest weight between them is to be added. A MBST is found consisting of all the edges found in previous steps.

Pseudocode 

The procedure has two input parameters. G is a graph, w is a weights array of all edges in the graph G.
 function MBST(graph G, weights w)
     E ← the set of edges of G 
     if | E | = 1 then return E else
         A ← half edges in E whose weights are no less than the median weight
         B ← E - A
         F ← forest of GB
         if F is a spanning tree then
             return MBST(GB,w)
         else
             return MBST((GA)η, w)  F
In the above (GA)η is the subgraph composed of super vertices (by regarding vertices in a disconnected component as one) and edges in A.

Running time 

The algorithm is running in O(E) time, where E is the number of edges.  This bound is achieved as follows: 
 dividing into two sets with median-finding algorithms in O(E)
 finding a forest in O(E)
 considering half edges in E in each iteration O(E + E/2 + E/4 + ··· + 1) = O(E)

Example 

In the following example green edges are used to form a MBST and dashed red areas indicate super vertices formed during the algorithm steps.

MBSA algorithms for directed graphs 
There are two algorithms available for directed graph: Camerini's algorithm for finding MBSA and another from Gabow and Tarjan.

Camerini's algorithm for MBSA 
For a directed graph, Camerini's algorithm focuses on finding the set of edges that would have its maximum cost as the bottleneck cost of the MBSA. This is done by partitioning the set of edges E into two sets A and B and maintaining the set T that is the set in which it is known that GT does not have a spanning arborescence, increasing T by B whenever the maximal arborescence of G(B ∪ T) is not a spanning arborescence of G, otherwise we decrease E by A. The total time complexity is O(E log E).

Pseudocode 
 function MBSA(G, w, T) is
     E ← the set of edges of G 
     if | E − T | > 1 then
         A ← UH(E-T)
         B ← (E − T) − A
         F ← BUSH(GBUT)
         if F is a spanning arborescence of G then
             S ← F
             MBSA((GBUT), w, T)
         else
             MBSA(G, w, TUB);

 T represents a subset of E for which it is known that GT does not contain any spanning arborescence rooted at node “a”. Initially T is empty
 UH takes (E−T) set of edges in G and returns A ⊂ (E−T) such that:
 
 Wa ≥ Wb , for a ∈ A and b ∈ B
 BUSH(G) returns a maximal arborescence of G rooted at node “a”
 The final result will be S

Example

Gabow and Tarjan algorithm for MBSA 
Gabow and Tarjan provided a modification of Dijkstra's algorithm for single-source shortest path that produces an MBSA. Their algorithm runs in O(E + V log V) time if Fibonacci heap used.

Pseudocode 
  For a graph G(V,E), F is a collection of vertices in V. 
  Initially, F = {s} where s is the starting point of the graph G and c(s) = -∞
 
  1  function MBSA-GT(G, w, T)
  2      repeat |V| times
  3          Select v with minimum c(v) from F; 
  4          Delete it from the F;
  5          for ∀ edge(v, w) do
  6              if w ∉ F or ∉ Tree then
  7                  add w to F;          
  8                  c(w) = c(v,w);
  9                  p(w) = v;     
  10             else
  11                 if w ∈ F and c(w) > c(v, w) then
  12                     c(w) = c(v, w);
  13                     p(w) = v;

Example 
The following example shows that how the algorithm works.

The algorithm finds  in which it is the value of the bottleneck edge in any MBSA.

References

Graph algorithms
Spanning tree